An RGB color space is any additive color space based on the RGB color model. 

RGB color spaces are commonly found describing the input signal to display devices such as television screens and computer monitors.

Definition

The normal human eye contains three types of color-sensitive cone cells. Each cell is responsive to light of either long, medium, or short wavelengths, which we generally categorize as red, green, and blue. Taken together, the responses of these cone cells are called the Tristimulus values, and the combination of their responses is processed into the psychological effect of color vision.

An RGB color space is defined by:
 Chromaticity coordinates of the red, green, and blue additive primaries.
 Chromaticity of the white point, which is usually a standard illuminant.
 The transfer function, also known as the tone response curve (TRC) or gamma, that maps chromaticity to tristimulus values.

An RGB color space uses primaries based on the RGB color model. Mixing of the three primaries in different proportions then creates the perception of colors other than the primaries. Applying Grassmann's law of light additivity, the range of colors that can be produced are those enclosed within the triangle on the chromaticity diagram defined using the primaries as vertices. The TRC and white point further define the possible colors, creating a volume of encodable colors enclosed within the 3D-triangle.

The primary colors are usually specified in terms of their xyY chromaticity coordinates, though the uʹ,vʹ coordinates from the UCS chromaticity diagram may be used. Both xyY and uʹ,vʹ are derived from the CIE 1931 color space, a device independent space also known as XYZ which covers the full gamut of human-perceptible colors visible to the CIE 2° standard observer.

Applications

RGB color spaces are well-suited to describing the electronic display of color, such as computer monitors and color television. These devices often reproduce colours using an array of red, green, and blue phosphors agitated by a cathode ray tube (CRT), or an array of red, green, and blue LCDs lit by a backlight, and are therefore naturally described by an additive color model with RGB primaries.

Early examples of RGB color spaces came with the adoption of the NTSC color television standard in 1953 across North America, followed by PAL and SECAM covering the rest of the world. These early RGB spaces were defined in part by the phosphor used by CRTs in use at the time, and the gamma of the electron beam. While these color spaces reproduced the intended colors using additive red, green, and blue primaries, the broadcast signal itself was encoded from RGB components to a composite signal such as YIQ, and decoded back by the receiver into RGB signals for display.

HDTV uses the BT.709 color space, later repurposed for computer monitors as sRGB. Both use the same color primaries and white point, but different transfer functions, as HDTV is intended for a dark living room while sRGB is intended for a brighter office environment. The gamut of these spaces is limited, covering only 35.9% of the CIE 1931 gamut. While this allows the use of a limited bit depth without causing color banding, and therefore reduces transmission bandwidth, it also prevents the encoding of deeply saturated colors that might be available in an alternate color spaces. Some RGB color spaces such as Adobe RGB and ProPhoto intended for the creation, rather than transmission, of images are designed with expanded gamuts to address this issue, however this does not mean the larger space has 'more colors". The numerical quantity of colors is related to bit depth and not the size or shape of the gamut. A large space with a low bit depth can be detrimental to the gamut density and result in high  errors. 

More recent color spaces such as Rec. 2020 for UHD-TVs define an extremely large gamut covering 63.3% of the CIE 1931 space. This standard is not currently realisable with current LCD technology, and alternative architectures such as quantum dot or OLED based devices are currently in development.

RGB color space specifications 

The CIE 1931 color space standard defines both the CIE RGB space, which is an RGB color space with monochromatic primaries, and the CIE XYZ color space, which is functionally similar to a linear RGB color space, however the primaries are not physically realizable, thus are not described as red, green, and blue.

M.A.C. is not to be confused with MacOS. Here, M.A.C.refers to Multiplexed Analogue Components.

See also

CIELUV color space
Web colors
RGB color model
RGBA color model

References

External links
 

Color space